Abu Nasar Khan Choudhury is an Indian politician who was the Minister of State for Science and Technology in the Government of West Bengal. He has served as an MLA, elected from the Sujapur constituency in the 2011 West Bengal state assembly election.

He resigned from the ministry when Congress withdrew its support to the Mamata Banerjee government in September 2012.
He Joined Trinamool Congress In June 2015.

Education
After his matriculation in 1951 and graduation from Malda College in 1956, Choudhury went abroad. He completed his initial postgraduate study from the University of Liverpool in 1965 and an MPhil in 1976 from the University of Leicester, England. He obtained his doctoral degree from the University of Zurich in Switzerland in 1986.

References 

State cabinet ministers of West Bengal
Living people
West Bengal MLAs 2006–2011
West Bengal MLAs 2011–2016
Indian National Congress politicians from West Bengal
1935 births
Trinamool Congress politicians from West Bengal
20th-century Bengalis
21st-century Bengalis